Meadowbrook is an unincorporated community and census-designated place (CDP) in Shelby County, Alabama, United States. At the 2020 census, the population was 9,688. It is part of the Birmingham metropolitan area.

Geography
Meadowbrook is located at  (33.403788, -86.690758).

The community is located within the southeastern suburbs of Birmingham, generally bounded by U.S. Route 280 to the north, Alabama State Route 119 to the east, Valleydale Rd to the west, and Meadow Brook Rd to the south. Downtown Birmingham is 13 mi (21 km) to the northwest via US 280.

Demographics

At the 2000 census there were 4,697 people, 1,659 households, and 1,373 families living in the community. The racial makeup of the community was 94.29% White, 2.87% Black or African American, 0.04% Native American, 2.09% Asian, 0.06% from other races, and 0.64% from two or more races. 0.66% of the population were Hispanic or Latino of any race.
Of the 1,659 households 46.7% had children under the age of 18 living with them, 74.6% were married couples living together, 6.0% had a female householder with no husband present, and 17.2% were non-families. 14.9% of households were one person and 2.4% were one person aged 65 or older. The average household size was 2.83 and the average family size was 3.17.

The age distribution was 30.8% under the age of 18, 5.0% from 18 to 24, 29.0% from 25 to 44, 28.8% from 45 to 64, and 6.4% 65 or older. The median age was 38 years. For every 100 females, there were 96.0 males. For every 100 females age 18 and over, there were 92.8 males.

The median household income was $83,715 and the median family income  was $92,579. Males had a median income of $70,462 versus $35,179 for females. The per capita income for the community was $35,511. About 1.3% of families and 1.3% of the population were below the poverty line, including 0.6% of those under age 18 and 2.7% of those age 65 or over.

2010 census
At the 2010 census there were 8,769 people, 3,187 households, and 2,523 families living in the community. The racial makeup of the community was 92.8% White, 3.9% Black or African American, 0.1% Native American, 2.1% Asian, 0.3% from other races, and 0.8% from two or more races. 1.6% of the population were Hispanic or Latino of any race.
Of the 3,187 households 40.2% had children under the age of 18 living with them, 69.2% were married couples living together, 7.8% had a female householder with no husband present, and 20.8% were non-families. 17.7% of households were one person and 3.1% were one person aged 65 or older. The average household size was 2.75 and the average family size was 3.15.

The age distribution was 27.5% under the age of 18, 6.7% from 18 to 24, 23.2% from 25 to 44, 34.6% from 45 to 64, and 8.1% 65 or older. The median age was 40.3 years. For every 100 females, there were 97.6 males. For every 100 females age 18 and over, there were 91.5 males.

The median household income was $98,862 and the median family income  was $103,602. Males had a median income of $83,039 versus $52,460 for females. The per capita income for the community was $40,393. About 1.3% of families and 1.4% of the population were below the poverty line, including 1.2% of those under age 18 and 0% of those age 65 or over.

References

Unincorporated communities in Alabama
Census-designated places in Shelby County, Alabama
Census-designated places in Alabama
Birmingham metropolitan area, Alabama
Unincorporated communities in Shelby County, Alabama